Simin Behbahani, her surname also appears as Bihbahani (née Siminbar Khalili; ; 20 July 1927 – 19 August 2014) was a prominent Iranian contemporary poet, lyricist and activist. She is known for her poems in a ghazal-style of poetic form. She was an icon of modern Persian poetry, Iranian intelligentsia and literati who affectionately refer to her as the lioness of Iran. She was nominated twice for the Nobel Prize in literature, and "received many literary accolades around the world."

Early life and family

Abbās Khalili wrote poetry in both Persian and Arabic and he translated some 1100 verses of Ferdowsi's Shahnameh into Arabic. Fahr-Ozma Arghun was one of the progressive women of her time and a member of Kānun-e Nesvān-e Vatan'khāh (Association of Patriotic Women) between 1925 and 1929. In addition to her membership of Hezb-e Democrāt (Democratic Party) and Kānun-e Zanān (Women's Association), she was for a time (1932) Editor of the Āyandeh-ye Iran (Future of Iran) newspaper. She taught French at the secondary schools Nāmus, Dār ol-Mo'allemāt and No'bāvegān in Tehran.

Career 
Simin Behbahani started writing poetry at twelve and published her first poem at the age of fourteen. She used the "Char Pareh" style of Nima Yooshij and subsequently turned to ghazal. Behbahani contributed to a historic development by adding theatrical subjects and daily events and conversations to poetry using the ghazal style of poetry. She has expanded the range of the traditional Persian verse forms and has produced some of the most significant works of the Persian literature in the 20th century.

She was President of the Iranian Writers' Association and was nominated for the Nobel Prize in Literature in 1999 and 2002. In 2013, she was awarded the Janus Pannonius Grand Prize for Poetry.

In early March 2010, she could not leave the country due to official prohibitions. As she was about to board a plane to Paris, police detained her and interrogated her "all night long". She was released but without her passport. Her English translator (Farzaneh Milani) expressed surprise at the arrest as detention as Behbahani was then 82 and nearly blind, "we all thought that she was untouchable."

Personal life 
She had two marriages, the first was to Hassan Behbahani and it ended in divorce. She had three children from her first marriage, one daughter and two sons. Her second marriage was to Manuchehr Koushyar and it ended when he died in 1984.

Death
Behbahani was hospitalized on 6 August 2014. She remained in coma from 6 August until her death on 19 August 2014, and died in Tehran's Pars Hospital of Pulmonary heart disease at the age of 87. Her funeral, attended by thousands, was held on 22 August in Vahdat Hall, and her body was buried at Behesht-e Zahra.

Works

The Broken Lute [Seh-tar-e Shekasteh, 1951]
Footprint [Ja-ye Pa, 1954]
Chandelier [Chelcheragh, 1955]
Marble [Marmar 1961]
Resurrection [Rastakhiz, 1971]
A Line of Speed and Fire [Khatti ze Sor'at va Atash, 1980]
Arzhan Plain [Dasht-e Arzhan, 1983]
Paper Dress [Kaghazin Jameh, 1992]
A Window of freedom [Yek Daricheh Azadi, 1995]
Collected Poems [Tehran 2003]
Maybe It's the Messiah [Shayad ke Masihast, Tehran 2003] Selected Poems, translated by Ali Salami
A Cup of Sin, Selected poems, translated by Farzaneh Milani and Kaveh Safa

Awards and honours
1998 – Human Rights Watch Hellman-Hammet Grant
1999 – Carl von Ossietzky Medal
2006 – Norwegian Authors' Union Freedom of Expression Prize
2009 – mtvU Poet Laureate
2013 – Janus Pannonius Poetry Prize, from the Hungarian PEN Club

See also

 Mina Assadi
 Parvin E'tesami
 Forough Farrokhzad
 Leila Kasra

References

Further reading
 Chopra, R M, " Eminent Poetesses of Persian ", Iran Society, Kolkata, 2010

External links

Biography of Simin Behbahani
An International Symposium on The Life and Poetry of Simin Behbahani
A Poet Who 'Never Sold Her Pen or Soul'
Simin Behbahani Lecture & Book Signing – UCLA
Simin Behbahani reads poetry at SOAS, University of London, 6 February 2005, YouTube (part 1, part 2).
Sārā Ommat-e Ali, Simin Behbahani: I am alive, in Persian, Sarmāyeh [Capital] Newspaper (Ruz'nāmeh-ye Sarmāyeh). Reprinted in: Association of the Iranian Women (Kānun-e Zanān-e Irani), Wednesday 5 December 2007.
Shahāb Mirzāi, A Line Made From Swiftness and Fire (Khatti ze Sor'at va Ātash), in Persian, Jadid Online, 2008, [http://www.jadidonline.com/story/17072008/frnk/simin_behbahani.A slide show of photographs with text spoken by Simin Behbahani, Jadid Online, 2008:] (3 min 56 sec).

1927 births
2014 deaths
20th-century Iranian poets
Persian-language poets
Writers from Tehran
Iranian lyricists
Iranian women writers
Persian-language women poets
Iranian women's rights activists
Iranian democracy activists
Members of the National Council for Peace
Iranian Writers Association members
Iranian people of Iraqi descent
21st-century Iranian poets
Poets from Tehran